Surrounded is a live worship album by Christian recording artist Michael W. Smith. It was released on February 23, 2018 through Rocketown Records and The Fuel Music.

Track listing

Personnel 
Musicians
 Michael W. Smith – lead vocals, Hammond B3 organ, additional keys and programming
 Jim Daneker – keys and programming
 Kyle Lee – additional keys and programming, acoustic guitars
 Josh Moore – additional keys and programming
 David Ramirez – additional keys and programming
 Stuart Garrard – electric guitar
 James Duke – electric guitar
 Otto Price – bass
 Paul Mabury – drums, percussion

Background vocals
 Nia Allen
 Brittany Batson
 Eden DeJesus 
 David Dennis 
 Jamia Ellis 
 Alex Gomez
 Mark Gutierrez (also additional lead vocals on "Miracles")
 Martrell Harris 
 Ana Hudgins 
 Tammy Jensen
 Chris Kim 
 Jenna Long
 Josh Lopez 
 Calvin Nowell (also additional lead vocals on "Great Are You Lord")
 Michelle Schorr 
 Debi Selby 
 Ilia Share 
 Cedric Williams
 David Wise

Production 
 Kyle Lee – producer, mixing
 Michael W. Smith – co-producer, executive producer
 Chaz Corzine – executive producer
 Greg Ham – executive producer
 Derek Spirk – associate executive producer
 Danny Duncan – engineer, recording for Vanguard Recording
 Rob Williams – assistant recording
 Austin Berger – assistant recording
 Willie Flynn – assistant recording
 Daniel Johnston – assistant recording
 Conrad Johnson – additional engineering
 Foster Farrell – additional engineering
 The Factory (Franklin, Tennessee) – recording location
 The Void (Franklin, Tennessee) – mixing location
 Bob Boyd – mastering at Ambient Digital (Houston, Texas)
 Brandon Chesbro – photography
 Brody Harper – creative director 
 Nick DePartee – art, design
 Keelin Crew – A&R administration
 The MWS Group – management

Accolades

Chart performance

References

2018 albums
Michael W. Smith albums